Daniel F. Spulber (born January 31, 1953) is the Elinor Hobbs Distinguished Professor of International Business and professor of strategy at the Kellogg School of Management (Northwestern University), where he has taught since 1990. Spulber is also professor of law at the Northwestern University School of Law and research director of the Searle Center on Law, Regulation, and Economic Growth. He is the founding editor-in-chief of the Journal of Economics & Management Strategy.

Education and early career 
His father was the Romanian economist Nicolas Spulber, who taught for many years at Indiana University Bloomington. Daniel Spulber received his B.A. in economics from the University of Michigan in 1974, his M.A. in economics from Northwestern University in 1976, and his Ph.D. in economics from Northwestern University in 1979. He taught at Brown University, the University of Southern California, and the California Institute of Technology before returning to Northwestern.

Academic work 
Spulber's research is in the areas of international economics, industrial organization, microeconomic theory, innovation, entrepreneurship, management strategy, and law. In 1996, he was ranked 6th among economists in the United States and also highly ranked for 1979-2003 adjusted appearances. Spulber has published numerous journal articles in economics journals and law reviews.

Selected books

Books written 

 Economics and Management of Competitive Strategy, 2009, New Jersey: World Scientific Press
 Networks in Telecommunications: Economics and Law, with Christopher Yoo, 2009, Cambridge: Cambridge University Press
 Global Competitive Strategy, 2007, Cambridge: Cambridge University Press
 Management Strategy, 2004, New York: McGraw Hill
 Market Microstructure: Intermediaries and the Theory of the Firm, 1999, New York: Cambridge University Press
 The Market Makers: How Leading Companies Create and Win Markets, 1998, New York: McGraw-Hill/ Business Week Books
 Deregulatory Takings and the Regulatory Contract: The Competitive Transformation of Network Industries in the United States, with J. Gregory Sidak, 1997, Cambridge University Press
 Protecting Competition from the Postal Monopoly, with J. Gregory Sidak, 1996, Washington, D.C.: American Enterprise Institute
 Regulation and Markets, 1989, Cambridge, Mass: MIT Press

Books edited 
 Famous Fables of Economics: Myths of Market Failures, 2002, Malden, MA: Basil Blackwell
 Essays in the Economics of Renewable Resources, edited with Leonard J. Mirman, 1982, Amsterdam: Elsevier-North Holland Publishing Co.

References

External links 
 
 Searle Center on Law, Regulation, and Economic Growth

1953 births
Living people
21st-century American economists
Academic journal editors
Northwestern University faculty
Northwestern University alumni
University of Michigan College of Literature, Science, and the Arts alumni